Change of Heart (French: Mon coeur au ralenti) is a 1928 French silent film directed by Marco de Gastyne and starring Philippe Hériat, Annette Benson and Olaf Fjord. It is based on the novel Mon coeur au ralenti by the French writer Maurice Dekobra.

Cast
In alphabetical order
 Annette Benson as Griselda Turner  
 Juliette Compton as Lady Diana Wynham  
 Olaf Fjord as Prince Seliman  
 Philippe Hériat as Comte Alfierini  
 Choura Milena as Evelyn Turner  
 Gaston Modot as Chapinsky  
 Georges Paulais as Yarichkine 
 Varvara Yanova as Billie Swanson

See also
 Madonna of the Sleeping Cars (1928), with Claude France as Lady Diana Wynham and Olaf Fjord as Prince Seliman 
 The Phantom Gondola (1936), with Marcelle Chantal as Lady Diana Wyndham
 Madonna of the Sleeping Cars (1955), with Gisèle Pascal as Lady Diana Wyndham

References

Bibliography 
 Goble, Alan. The Complete Index to Literary Sources in Film. Walter de Gruyter, 1999.

External links 
 

1928 films
French silent films
1920s French-language films
Films directed by Marco de Gastyne
Films based on French novels
French black-and-white films
Pathé films
1920s French films